Echium amoenum (In Persian: گل گاوزبان) is one of the important medicinal herbs in Iranian traditional medicine. E. amoenum has been advocated for a variety of effects such as demulcent, anti-inflammatory and analgesic, especially for the common cold, and as an anxiolytic and sedative.

See also
 Medicinal herbs
 Iranian traditional medicine

References

amoenum
Flora of Western Asia
Flora of Iran
Flora of the Caucasus